Country Code: +229
International Call Prefix: 00
Trunk Prefix:

Calling formats
 yyxx xxxx   Calls within Benin
 +229 yyxx xxxx  Calls from outside Benin
The NSN length is eight digits.

List of area codes in Benin

Mobile phone numbers 
Mobile phone numbers in Benin, are prefixed by:
    40
    42
    44
    60-69
    90-93
    95-98

References

Benin dial codes - accessed 27 April 2010.

Benin
Telecommunications in Benin
Telephone numbers